Livingstone's yellow bat or Livingstone's house bat (Scotophilus livingstonii) is a species of bat found in Africa.

Taxonomy and etymology
It was described as a new species in 2014. The holotype was collected in 1985 in Kenya. It is a sister taxon to the African yellow bat (S. dinganii) and Scotophilus trujilloi. The eponym for the species name "livingstonii" is Scottish explorer David Livingstone.

Description
Its fur is reddish-mahogany in color.

Range and status
It has been documented in Ghana and Kenya. As Ghana and Kenya are on opposite sides of the continent, it is likely that its range includes some of the countries between.

As of 2017 it is evaluated as a least-concern species by the IUCN. It is threatened by intentional destruction of its roosts by humans.

References

External links
Images and a distribution map for this species

Bats of Africa
Mammals described in 2014
Scotophilus